Binibining Pilipinas 2002 was the 39th edition of Binibining Pilipinas. It took place at the Smart Araneta Coliseum in Quezon City, Metro Manila, Philippines on March 16, 2002.

At the end of the event Zorayda Ruth Andam crowned Karen Loren Agustin as Binibining Pilipinas Universe 2002, Gilrhea Quinzon crowned Katherine Ann Manalo as Binibining Pilipinas World 2002, while Maricarl Tolosa crowned Kristine Alzar as Binibining Pilipinas International 2002. Margaret-Ann Bayot was named First Runner-Up, while Maria Lourdes Magno was named Second Runner-Up.

Results

Color keys
  The contestant was a Runner-up in an International pageant.
  The contestant was a Semi-Finalist in an International pageant.
  The contestant did not place.

Special Awards

Contestants
23 contestants competed for the three titles.

Notes

Post-pageant Notes 
 Karen Loren Agustin competed at Miss Universe 2002 in San Juan, Puerto Rico but was unplaced.
 Katherine Anne Manalo competed at Miss World 2002 in London, United Kingdom and was one of the ten semifinalists.
 Kristine Alzar competed at Miss International 2002 in Tokyo, Japan but was unplaced. Prior to competing in Miss International, Alzar competed at Miss Tourism International Black Sea 2002 and won.
 Margaret-Ann Bayot competed at Miss Internet WWW 2002 and was 2nd Runner-up. She competed again at Binibining Pilipinas 2004 and won Binibining Pilipinas International 2004. She competed at Miss International 2004 in Beijing, China and was one of the fifteen semifinalists.

References

External links
 Official Binibining Pilipinas website

2002
2002 in the Philippines
2002 beauty pageants